EAFF E-1 Football Championship is an international football competition in East Asia for national teams of the East Asian Football Federation (EAFF). The competition between women's national teams is held alongside men's competition.

History
In 2005 there was also a combined points competition in 2005, where the results of the men's and women's teams were added together (not including qualifiers). In April 2012, the competition was renamed to the "EAFF East Asian Cup". In December 2015, the new competition name "EAFF East Asian Championship" was approved, but later changed to "EAFF E-1 Football Championship".

Results
Played in odd years. North Korea and Japan have won the tournament three times.

Tournament winners

Summary

Final (2005–2022)

Preliminary (2008–2019)

Awards

Winning coaches

Comprehensive team results by tournament
Numbers refer to the final placing of each team at the respective Games.

See also
 EAFF E-1 Football Championship (men)
 AFF Women's Championship
 CAFA Women's Championship
 SAFF Women's Championship
 WAFF Women's Championship
 AFC Women's Asian Cup

References

External links
 EAFF E-1 Football Championship 2022